Silverado Canyon is a roughly 2,500-foot-deep (760 m) gorge in the Santa Ana Mountains, in the U.S. state of California. They are part of the Santa Ana River watershed. A hiking trail/fire road runs the entire length of the canyon.

Background

The town of Silverado is situated in the canyon, with most of its buildings between the point where the canyon opens out into a valley and a U.S. Forest Service gate where the valley road enters the Cleveland National Forest. The town is mostly residential; there are, however, also a few stores, mostly in the east side.  Modjeska Peak, part of Saddleback, rises to the south;  Bald Peak forms the head of the gorge to the east, and  Bedford Peak towers to the north.

Silverado Creek runs year round, reaching its highest flow in winter and early spring, while diminishing to a trickle for most of the rest of the year. For its first few miles through the upper reaches of the gorge, its flow is perennial, although it has been known to dry up at the low-water crossing directly upstream of the Forest Service gate. By the time it reaches the downstream end of Silverado, it is usually dry. Most of its tributaries, including Ladd Canyon Creek, are also seasonal.

Several trails run out of the canyon. One of the most popular is the Silverado Motorway, which was originally a fire road but now is overgrown with plants, forming a single-track trail. The trail climbs out of the canyon toward the northeast and eventually intersects the Main Divide Road, which runs along the canyon rim to the north and east.

The canyon is so named because silver mines originally operated in the area. Tailings from the Blue Light Mine milling operation on the south side of the canyon still leak toxic waste into the creek and surrounding soil, and cleanup is underway by the Forest Service. In 2002, two people exploring the mine drowned in one of the flooded lower passageways.

References

Canyons and gorges of California
Landforms of Orange County, California 
Orange County, California articles needing infoboxes
Rivers of Orange County, California
Tributaries of the Santa Ana River
Rivers of Southern California